This page covers all the important events in the sport of tennis in 1990. Primarily, it provides the results of notable tournaments throughout the year on both the ATP and WTA Tours, the Davis Cup, and the Fed Cup.

ITF

Grand Slam events

Australian Open

The 1990 Australian Open, the first major of the year, was a tennis tournament that took place at Flinders Park in Melbourne, Australia. It was held from 15 to 28 January.

French Open

The 1990 French Open took place at the Stade Roland Garros in Paris, France from 28 May until 10 June.

Wimbledon

The 1990 Wimbledon Championships, the only major played on grass courts, took place at the All England Lawn Tennis and Croquet Club in Wimbledon, London, England. It was held from 25 June to 8 July.

US Open

The 1990 US Open, the last tennis major of the year, was played at the USTA National Tennis Center in New York City, United States, being held from 27 August to 9 September.

Davis Cup

Final

Fed Cup

Final

ATP Tour

Year-End Championships
Frankfurt, Germany (November 13 – November 18)
Singles:  Andre Agassi defeated  Stefan Edberg, 5–7, 7–6(7–5), 7–5, 6–2

ATP Championship Series single week

WTA Tour

Year-End Championships
New York City, USA (November 18 – November 24)
Singles:  Monica Seles defeated  Gabriela Sabatini, 6-4, 5-7, 3-6, 6-4, 6-2

Tier I Series

International Tennis Hall of Fame
Class of 1990:
Jan Kodes, player
Joseph Cullman, contributor

See also
 1990 in sports

 
Tennis by year